The Bristol 412 is a car which was produced by British manufacturer Bristol Cars from 1975 to 1986. Variants were produced as the Bristol Beaufighter, from 1980 to 1993, and as the Bristol Beaufort, from 1984 to 1994.

Bristol 412

Along with the Bristol 603, it was one of two concurrent successors to the long-serving 411 that had carried Bristol Cars through from the late 1960s to the late 1970s. The 412 was the last in the continuously numbered series of Bristols beginning with Bristol 400.

Whereas the 603 was a dramatically restyled version of the characteristic Bristol two-door saloon, the 412 was different in that it was a Targa-type convertible with a removable roof that could be placed in the large luggage compartment. The earliest versions of the 412 were also very unusual for a post-World War II car in that the body was made by Zagato in Italy and attached to a chassis built by Bristol Cars in Filton, England. This chassis was almost exactly the same as that of the Bristol 603, but the earliest 412s retained the Chrysler B series petrol engines 6,277 cc (383 cubic inches) that had been used in the 411. However, the second series of 412, which arrived towards the end of 1977,
changed to the same 5,899 cc (360 cubic inch) petrol engine as that used in the Bristol 603 and later in its successor, the Bristol Britannia.

The 1977 second series cars incorporated front suspension modifications to allow for the lighter engine along with a final drive ratio changed to 2.88:1.

In an effort to move into the United States market, Bristol designed a 412USA that complied with the extremely strict emissions and safety regulations of the US, with a catalytic converter and a much stronger roll bar than on the first 412. However, the company's specialist status made exporting very difficult and most of these modified 412 models were exported to Europe and markets such as West Germany and Switzerland.

Bristol Beaufighter
The Bristol Beaufighter, named after the WW2 aircraft produced by Bristol, was still designed by Zagato but now fully factory-bodied at Filton, had very similar styling to the original 412 except for the four-headlamp layout.

However, the 5,899 cc V8 engine was upgraded by the addition of a Rotomaster turbocharger which gave the Beaufighter a maximum speed of 241 km/h (150 mph). To cope with the extra torque, the Torqueflite automatic gearbox that had been a constant in every Bristol since the 407, was upgraded with a stronger, thicker propeller shaft and a torque converter taken from the 7.2 litre (440 cubic inch) RB engine found in Chrysler's top-of-the-line models during the 1970s.

The Beaufighter was first built in 1982 and continued until 1993. “Fewer than 20” were made, according to the Bristol Cars website.

Bristol Beaufort
For export only, primarily to continental Europe, the Bristol Beaufort-once again named after a WW2 Bristol aircraft-was the last development of the 412 to appear. It used the same turbocharged 5,899 cc V8 found in the Beaufighter. Unlike other versions of the 412, the Beaufort was a true convertible, with a powered roof.

The Beaufort had a reinforced windscreen frame to compensate for the absence of a fixed roll bar. This allowed a range from one fill-up to the next of around  whereas the Britannia, Brigand, and Beaufighter could typically only go for  without refuelling. It was produced in very small numbers until 1994.

References

External links

 Bristol Owners Club, Bristol Type 412 – Convertible / Saloon

412
1980s cars
Convertibles
Rear-wheel-drive vehicles
Cars introduced in 1975